Mount Eagle is the highest point on the island of Saint Croix at an elevation of .

A hiking trail leading from West Scenic Road leads to the summit from 17°75'8264°N, -64°80'4354

See also
Geography of the United States Virgin Islands

References

Mountains of the United States Virgin Islands
Landforms of Saint Croix, U.S. Virgin Islands